Koris Vieules (born 9 October 1970) is a French former equestrian. He competed in the team eventing at the 1996 Summer Olympics.

References

External links
 

1970 births
Living people
French male equestrians
Olympic equestrians of France
Equestrians at the 1996 Summer Olympics
People from Brive-la-Gaillarde
Sportspeople from Corrèze